A cram school, informally called crammer and colloquially also referred to as test-prep or exam factory, is a specialized school  that trains its students to achieve particular goals, most commonly to pass the entrance examinations of high schools or universities. The English name is derived from the slang term cramming, meaning to study hard or to study a large amount of material in a short period of time.

Education
Cram schools may specialize in a particular subject or subjects, or may be aligned with particular schools. Special cram schools that prepare students to re-take failed entrance examinations are also common. As the name suggests, the aim of a cram school is generally to impart as much information to its students as possible in the shortest period of time. The goal is to enable the students to obtain a required grade in particular examinations, or to satisfy other entrance requirements such as language skill (e.g.: IELTS). Cram schools are sometimes criticised, along with the countries in which they are prevalent, for a focus on rote learning and a lack of training in critical thinking and analysis.

By region

Australia 
Cram schools are referred to largely as "coaching colleges", they are used primarily to achieve the necessary results for the entrance exam for selective schools in New South Wales. They are also used extensively in English, mathematics and science courses for the Higher School Certificate, Victorian Certificate of Education, and other high school leavers exams.

Bangladesh 
In Bangladesh, cram schools are known as "coaching centers" and in some cases, "tutorials". Most cram schools provide help for admission tests of public universities and medical colleges, and public examinations like PSC, JSC, SSC, and HSC. There are also some variants which have entered the market of ever-increasing help seekers. For example, cram schools now also prepare students for language tests like IELTS and TOEFL, aptitude tests like GRE, GMAT, SAT, and so on. In recent years, cram schools have also been extended to the tests for government civil services like BCS Examination.

Brazil 

Cram schools are called "Cursinhos" (lit. Little Courses) in Brazil and are attended by students who will be taking a vestibular exam to be admitted into a university.

Chile
Cram schools are called "Preuniversitarios" in Chile and are attended by students to revise before taking PTU (University Transition Test) in order to get onto undergraduate studies.

China
Buxiban (补习班, Bǔxíbān) are cram schools located in China. They are related to the phenomenon of buke, which is extra study for the improvement of students’ academic performance in National Higher Education Entrance Examination (commonly known as Gaokao). They exist due to the importance of standardized exams, such as:
 High school entrance exam (after junior high, at 9th year of school).
 The National Higher Education Entrance Examination, or Gaokao, mandatory for college admission.
 English language exams.  Passing the College English Test (CET) band 4 and 6 is sometimes a prerequisite for bachelor's degree, and the certificates are often important to finding employment.  The TOEFL and GRE tests from ETS are required for studying abroad in English-speaking countries.
 Entrance exams to domestic graduate program.  Over recent years the competition has intensified, partially because many new college graduates fail to find satisfactory jobs and seek post-graduate education instead.

China has a test-driven system. Education departments give entrance examinations to sort students into schools of different levels. Examinations like the National Higher Education Entrance Examination (Gaokao) are vital, deciding the academic future of the participants. This education system cultivated the cramming style of teaching. Schools and teachers usually regard grades to be the primary goal. This sometimes leads to teachers imparting exam skills instead of knowledge and inspiration. But as the population of students decreases each year and admission to domestic universities expands, the pressure of the Entrance Exam has been reducing.

France

The national exam (baccalauréat) ending high-school is easy to obtain (the success rate is about 90%), and the marks obtained matter relatively little (most higher education school choose their students before the baccalauréat results, based on marks during high-school). Thus, baccalauréat cram schools are rare. Individual tutoring is more common.

After the baccalauréat, about 5% of the French students attend the Classes Préparatoires aux Grandes Écoles (prep school) or CPGE. These two-year programs are meant to prepare undergrad students to the entrance exams of high-profile graduate schools (Grandes écoles) in research, engineering and business — including École Normale Supérieure, HEC Paris, EDHEC, ESCP, EM Lyon, ESSEC, École polytechnique, Arts et Métiers ParisTech, Télécom Paris, École des Ponts, CentraleSupélec, École des Mines, and ISAE-SUPAERO. A large proportion of CPGE are public schools, with very small tuition fees. There are about 400 CPGE schools for 869 classes, including about 58 private schools. They have produced most of France's scientists, intellectuals, and executives during the last two centuries.

French prep schools are characterized by heavy workload and high demands, varying however between schools. Programs are, however, similar to the first two years in public universities. Students in CPGE have between 36 and 40 hours of class a week, as well as a weekly 2-to-4 hours written test (often on Saturday). Students are expected to work on their own at least 2 hours a day, while the most ambitious students can work more than 5 hours every evening after school, as well as during the weekend. Moreover, students take what is called "colles" (or "khôlles") mainly 2 times a week, which are oral interrogations. For science topics, it consists of an hour-long session where a group of typically 3 students, each on a board, and dealing with a question related to a specific lesson (e.g. a demonstration of a theorem) and/or exercises. The teacher listens to, assists and corrects the students. Khôlles on languages (e.g. English) consists in a 30 minutes test: first listening to an audio or studying a newspaper article and summarizing it, and then writing a short essay on the theme. Everything is then presented orally to the teacher. Literacy khôlles often consist in preparing and presenting an essay.

Entrance exams consist in written and oral exams. For scientific branches, a project involving research-oriented works has to be prepared. Written exams are typically 4h-long sets of exercises and problems built around a specific topic (which often can't be fully treated in the given amount of time), and require more reasoning than raw knowledge. Oral exams are often similar to khôlles.

This is a two-year track. In most schools, only the second year is explicitly focused on entrance exams preparation. If a student could not obtain the school(s) they wanted, they can repeat the second year.

There are three main branches : 
 Scientific branch study mainly math, physics and chemistry, IT, industrial sciences, biology and earth sciences. Sub-branches are : math-physics, physics-chemistry, physics-industrial sciences, and biology-earth sciences. Many French research scientists went through scientific CPGE.
 Economics/business branch (often called "Prépa HEC") study mainly social sciences, economy, math and languages. Many important French public figures and politicians went through this way. Sub-branches specialize in  math/economics, economics/social sciences, or management.
 Humanities branch (called Khâgne) study mainly philosophy, literature, foreign and ancient languages, history. Sub-branches specialize in social sciences or literature.

The various tracks and schools are known for their folklore (slang terms, songs and hymns, anecdotes), and often inherited from early 19th-century generations of students.

Greece

Φροντιστήρια (from φροντίζω, to take care of) have been a permanent fixture of the Greek educational system for several decades. They are considered the norm for learning foreign languages (English language learning usually starts during the elementary school years) and for having a chance to pass the university entrance examinations. The preparation for the country-wide university entrance examinations practically takes up the two last years of upper high school, and the general view is that the amount of relevant school hours is insufficient for the hard competition, regardless of the teachers' abilities. This leads to students taking state school lessons from 08.15 to 14.00 at school, going home for lunch, continue for two or three hours in the cramming school and returning to prepare the homework both for state school and "frontistirio". In the weekend, the students usually have lessons in the cramming school on Saturday morning and on Sunday morning revision tests. Unhired teachers by the state find a way to employment through these private businesses.

These two popular views pave the ground for the abundant number of cram schools, also attended by numerous high school students for general support of their performance.

Hong Kong

Cram schools in Hong Kong are called tutorial schools. These cram schools put focus on the major public examinations in Hong Kong, namely HKDSE, and teach students on techniques on answering questions in the examinations. They also provide students tips on which topics may appear on the coming examination (called "question tipping"), and provide students some sample questions that are similar to those that appear in the examinations. Some cram school teachers in Hong Kong have become idolised and attract many students to take their lessons. These teachers are called "King of tutors (補習天王)".  English and math are the most common subjects taught in Hong Kong cram schools.

Cram schools in Hong Kong are famous because of the stresses from Hong Kong Diploma of Secondary Education (HKDSE). These cram school teaching includes practicing exam questions and grammar drills. Moreover, they provide model essays for English language exam. However, some schools are not licensed, and few educators have teaching qualifications. Their education is fun and appealing to the students but may be of little use in actually passing exams.

India

Numerous cram schools—referred to as coaching centers/institutes, tutorials/tuitions or classes in India—have sprung up all over the nation. These tutorials have become a parallel education system and it is very common and almost mandatory for the students to go to cram schools. They aim to tutor students to pass schools and college exams and getting their clients through various competitive exams to enter prestigious institutions such as the Indian Institutes of Technology for engineering courses the All India Institutes of Medical Sciences for medical courses at the undergraduate & postgraduate levels and the National Law Universities for legal and judicial courses.

Many such schools prepare students to crack prestigious national entrance/scholarship exams at the high school level such as JEE (Joint Entrance Examination) Main & Advanced to enter prestigious engineering colleges like the IITs, NEET-UG (National Eligibility cum Entrance Test – Undergraduate level) for entrance into major medical science undergraduate programs and Common Law Admission Test (CLAT) for entering into premier law schools of the country.

Various such exams are held for entering fields such as scientific research, engineering, medicine, management, accountancy, law and also into India's premier central and state government services organised by UPSC, SSC etc.

Indonesia
Cram schools in Indonesia are called bimbingan belajar (learning assistance), often shortened into bimbel, and accepts students preparing for National Examinations before passing elementary school, junior high school, high school and college entrance exams. These cram schools teach students with exam simulations and problem-solving tutorials. Usually, these cram schools teach students by past exam questions. Bimbels in Indonesia offer lessons after school hours, weekends or public holidays.

Ireland
"Grind schools", as they are known in the Republic of Ireland, prepare students for the Leaving Certificate examination. Competition for university places (the "points race") has intensified with recent years: students wishing to study medicine, law or veterinary science in particular aim to achieve high points (up to 625) to be accepted. Some grind schools, such as The Institute of Education, Ashfield College, Leinster Senior College, The Dublin Academy of Education and Bruce College, teach full-time. Many others offer weekend or evening classes for students in subjects in which they struggle.

Japan

Cram schools, called juku, are special private schools common in Japan that offer lessons conducted after regular school hours, on weekends, and during school vacations.

Malaysia

In Malaysia, it is considered a norm for parents, especially those from the middle and upper class, to send schoolchildren for private tuition. Such services are often provided by tuition centres and/or private tutors. These tutors may be full-time tutors, schoolteachers, retirees, or even senior students. Many concerned parents choose to send their children to different tuition classes or schedules based on the child's entrance examination subjects. Some students may go to tuition for their weaker subjects, while many schoolchildren are increasingly known to attend at least 10 hours of private tuition every week. Correspondingly, the reputation and business of a tuition centre often depends on venue, schedule, number of top-scoring clients, and advertising by word of mouth. It is not uncommon for private tutors to offer exclusive pre-examination seminars, to the extent where some tutors entice schoolchildren to attend such seminars with the promise of examination tips, or even supposedly leaked examination questions.

Pakistan
In Pakistan, it has become very common for parents to send their children to such institutions, popularly known as "academies", after school for further private coaching. It has become prevalent in almost all levels of education, from junior classes to colleges and, to a lesser extent, universities. Due to the near-universality of this system, it has become very difficult to compete successfully in almost any level of exams without them, despite the added burden on the students.

Peru
In Peru, cram schools, known as "Academias", are institutions which intensively prepare, in about a year, high school graduates to gain admission to either University ("Academia Pre Universitaria"), or Military Schools ("Academia Pre-Militar").
Cram Schools in Peru are not an admission requirement to enter to any Tertiary Institution; however, due to fierce competition, preparation in a cram school allows the candidate to achieve the highest mark possible in the entry exam and so gain entry to their desired Tertiary Institution.
Cram Schools are independent of universities, however, of recent a post-high-school, pre-university school has started at some public and private universities in Peru. Under the name of CEntro PREuniversitario (name or acronym of university, for instance CEPREUNI or CEPREPUCP, after Universidad Nacional de Ingenieria or Pontificia Universidad Catolica del Peru, commonly referred to as "the CEPRE" or "the PRE"). Some of these CEPREs offer automatic admission to their university to their students who reach a set level of achievement

Philippines 
In the Philippines, cram schools are usually called "review centers" or "review schools". They are often attended by students in order to study for and pass college and university entrance examinations, or to pass licensure examinations such as the Philippine Bar Examination, the Philippine Physician Licensure Examination, or the Philippine Nurse Licensure Examination.

Singapore

In Singapore, it is very common for students in the local education system to be enrolled in cram schools, better known locally as tuition centers. Enrollment in these after-school tuition centers is extremely high, especially for students bound for national exams, such as the Primary School Leaving Examination (PSLE), GCE O Levels, or the GCE A Levels. Students attending tuition centers on a daily basis is not unheard of in Singapore.

South Korea

Although the South Korean educational system has been criticized internationally for its stress and competitiveness, it remains common for South Korean students to attend one or more cram schools ("hagwons") after their school-day is finished, most students studying there until 10 P.M. Some types of cram schools include math, science, art, and English. English language institutes along with math are particularly popular. Certain places, such as Gangnam in Seoul, are well known for having a lot of hagwons. Because of hagwons, many Koreans have voiced complaints about how public education is falling behind in terms of quality compared to private education, creating a gap between students who can afford the expensive hagwon tuition fee and those who cannot. Today, it is almost mandatory for Korean students to attend one or more hagwons in order to achieve high results on a test.

South Korean students have two big tests per semester: midterms and finals. They just have written tests in those subjects. A distinct feature of the cramming teaching method in Korea is extra preparation for these tests, ranging from tests from previous years and other schools to various prep books made by different education companies. These test preparation periods normally start a month before the test date. After school, generally, most students go to hagwons to supplement what they learned from the teachers who provide knowledge to the students. Students memorize for tests, and go to hagwons for high grades.

The Korean College Scholastic Ability Test, the standardized college entrance examination commonly referred to as the suneung, also plays a large part in why so many students attend hagwons. However, unlike midterms and finals, many high school students also prepare for the suneung through online video lessons on websites that specialize in suneung preparation.

Taiwan

Cram schools in Taiwan are called buxiban (補習班 literally "supplementary learning class", the same as in mainland China) and are not necessarily cram schools in the traditional sense.  Almost any kind of extracurricular academic lesson could be termed buxiban, such as music, art, math, and physics, even if students do not attend these classes specifically in order to pass an examination. It's a traditional belief that parents should send their children to all kinds of cram schools in order to compete against other talented children. Therefore, most children in Taiwan have a schedule packed with all sorts of cram school lessons. But when they study English, often with a "Native Speaker Teacher",  they are actually studying at a private language school. Furthermore,  since this study is ongoing,  they are not "cramming" in the traditional sense of the word, and therefore, these language schools are not cram schools by strict definition.

Taiwan is well known for its cram schools. Nearly all students have some kinds of cram school to improve their skills. The meritocratic culture, which requires some skills testing for passports to college, graduate school, and even government service, is dominant on Taiwan's policy.

Thailand

Cram schooling in Thailand has become almost mandatory to succeed in high school or in the entrance examinations of universities. Cram schools in Thailand, which are called tutoring institutes, tutoring schools, special tutoring, or special classes for example, are widespread throughout the country. Some of them do not have instructors in class rooms in a traditional sense; students receive their tuition via television network, which can either relay a live session from another branch or replay a pre-recorded session. Parents generally encourage their children to attend these schools and they sometimes can be perceived as pushy. The system of cram school is currently blamed for discouraging pupils from independent studies.

The main reason given by attending students is to increase understanding in their lessons. The secondary reason of junior high school students is to want to know faster techniques whereas the reason of senior ones is to prepare for exam. The most attended subjects are mathematics for juniors and English language for seniors. Average expense per course is about 2,001–3,000 baht.

Most of the students in the top universities of Thailand have attended at least one cram class, especially in science-based faculties such as science, engineering, medicine, and pharmacy.

Dek siw, those who failed in their first year, spend the whole following year studying at home or at a cram school for a better chance of going to a top university like Chulalongkorn University, Thammasart University, Kasetsart University, Mahidol University, or King Mongkut's University of Technology Thonburi.

Turkey
The dershane (plural, dershaneler) system is the Turkish counterpart of cram schools. The Turkish dershane system resembles Indian and Japanese systems. This is cheaper than private tutoring.

United Kingdom
Crammers first appeared in Britain after 1855 when the Civil Service Commission created the Administrative class of government employees, selected by examination and interview rather than patronage. Crammers offered to prepare men of 18 to 25 years old for these examinations, mainly in classics, economics and foreign languages, which would provide entry to civil service or diplomatic careers. The opening scenes of Benjamin Britten's 1971 television opera Owen Wingrave, and the 1892 novella by Henry James on which it is based, are set in a military crammer; its master plays an important role in both. Terence Rattigan's 1936 play French Without Tears is set in a language crammer typical of the period. These civil service crammers did not survive the Second World War. 

Tutorial colleges in the United Kingdom are also called "crammers", and are attended by some who want to attend the most prestigious universities. They have been around since the early 20th century.

United States
A number of businesses, called "tutoring services" or "test preparation centers", are colloquially known as cram schools. They are used by some GED candidates, and by many upperclassmen in high schools to prepare for the SAT, ACT, and/or Advanced Placement exams for college admission. Their curriculum is geared more towards vocabulary drills, problem sets, practising essay composition, and learning effective test-taking strategies. College graduates and undergraduates near graduation will sometimes attend such classes to prepare for entrance exams necessary for graduate level education (i.e. LSAT, DAT, MCAT, GRE).

Review courses for the CPA examination (e.g., Becker Conviser, part of Devry University) and the bar examination (e.g., Barbri) are often taken by undergraduate and graduate students in accountancy and law.

See also
Storefront school

References

External links
 "School Daze", Time Asia

School types

fr:Liste des classes préparatoires aux grandes écoles